Vanadurga or Vana Durga may refer to:

 Vanadurga (goddess), a manifestation of Durga, a violent form of Lakshmi
 Wanadurga, a village in Yadgir district, Karnataka, India
 Vanadurga Fort, a fort near Wanadurga village